Fernando Gomide is an electrical engineer at the State University of Campinas in São Paulo, Brazil. Gomide was named a Fellow of the Institute of Electrical and Electronics Engineers (IEEE) in 2016 for his contributions to fuzzy systems.

References

Fellow Members of the IEEE
Living people
Academic staff of the State University of Campinas
Brazilian engineers
Year of birth missing (living people)
Place of birth missing (living people)